The Estate is a 2020 American comedy thriller film directed by James Kapner and starring Eliza Coupe, Greg Finley, Chris Baker, Heather Matarazzo and Eric Roberts.  It is Kapner's feature directorial debut.

Plot
When the spoiled son and newest wife of a billionaire patriarch plot to murder him, they form a psycho-sexual bond with their brutally handsome hitman as they kill and kill (and kill) in their quest for wealth and recognition.

Cast
 Chris Baker as George
 Eliza Coupe as Lux
 Greg Finley as Joe
 Eric Roberts as Marcello
 Lala Kent as Caitlin
 Rocío de la Grana as Rose
 Alexandra Paul as Bethenny
 Heather Matarazzo as Mary
 Aubyn Philabaum as Tawny Taubin
 Ezra Buzzington as Mr. Amis
 Kyle Rezzarday as Pool Boy
 Allan Graf as Driver
 Trent Eisfeller as Valet
 Cohen Prescott as Boardroom Lawyer

Release
The film premiered at the Newport Beach Film Festival in October 2020.

Reception

The estate received mostly negative reviews from critics, holding a 27% rating on Rotten Tomatoes. It holds a 4.7 out of 10 on IMDB, with 364 ratings.

John Serba of Decider describer the film as "shallow, tonally uneven and only infrequently funny". Rating the film a 3/10, Alex McPherson of Cultured Vultures wrote that "The Estate is a cynical exercise in immaturity over substance". More positively, Rob Rector of Film Threat gave the film a 9 out of 10.

References

External links
 
 

2020 films
American comedy thriller films
LGBT-related black comedy films
2020 comedy films
2020 thriller films
2020s comedy thriller films
2020s English-language films
2020s American films